Rolled oats are a type of lightly processed whole-grain food. Traditionally, they are made from oat groats that have been dehusked and steamed, before being rolled into flat flakes under heavy rollers and then stabilized by being lightly toasted.

Thick-rolled oats are large whole flakes, and thin-rolled oats are smaller, fragmented flakes. Rolled whole oats, without further processing, can be cooked into a porridge and eaten as old-fashioned oats or Scottish oats, but more highly fragmented and processed rolled oats absorb water much more easily and therefore cook faster into a porridge, so they are sometimes called "quick" or "instant" oats.

Rolled oats are most often the main ingredient in granola and muesli. They can be further processed into a coarse powder, which, when cooked, becomes a thick liquid like broth. Finer oatmeal powder is often used as baby food.

Process 
The oat, like other cereals, has a hard, inedible outer husk that must be removed before the grain can be eaten. After the outer husk (or chaff) has been removed from the still bran-covered oat grains, the remainder is called oat groats. Since the bran layer, though nutritious, makes the grains tough to chew and contains an enzyme that can cause the oats to go rancid, raw oat groats are often further steam-treated to soften them for a quicker cooking time (modern "quick oats") and to denature the enzymes for a longer shelf life.

Steel-cut or pinhead oats 
Steel-cut or "pinhead" oats are oat groats that have been chopped into smaller pieces before any steaming and thus retain bits of the bran layer.

Preparation 
Rolled oats can be eaten without further heating or cooking, if the oats are soaked for 1–6 hours in water-based liquid, such as water, milk, or plant-based dairy substitutes. The soaking duration depends on shape, size and pre-processing technique, saving the time and the energy spent on heating, preserving its taste, and saving its nutritional values destroyed during cooking.

Traditionally, oat groats are a whole grain that can be used as a breakfast cereal, just like the various forms of oatmeal, rolled oats and pinhead oats can be cooked to make porridge. Rolled oats are used in granola, muesli, oatcakes, and flapjacks (like a granola bar, not a pancake).

Nutrients 
Whole oats (uncooked) are 68% carbohydrates, 6% fat, and 13% protein (table). In a 100-gram reference amount, whole oats supply 379 calories and contain high amounts (20% or more the Daily Value, DV) of the B vitamins – thiamine and pantothenic acid (40% and 22% DV, respectively) – and several dietary minerals, especially manganese (173% DV) and phosphorus (59% DV). As a rich source of dietary fiber (10 grams per 100 gram serving), whole oats supply beta-glucan (4 grams per 100 gram serving; table), a soluble fiber with cholesterol-lowering effects.

See also
 Flattened rice
 Oat bran
 Oat milk
 Oatcake

References

Breakfast
Breakfast cereals
Cereals
Food science
Oats
Porridges

hu:Zabpehely
ro:Fulgi de ovăz